阿里 (pinyin: ālǐ) may refer to:

Places
Alishan National Scenic Area, a mountain resort and natural preserve in Chiayi County, Republic of China (Taiwan)
Alishan Range, one of the five major mountain ranges of the island of Taiwan
Alishan Township, a township in Chiayi County, Republic of China (Taiwan)
Ali Prefecture, a prefecture of the Tibet Autonomous Region, People's Republic of China.

Other
Alibaba Group, Chinese company commonly referred to as 阿里